Debendranath Bandyopadhyay is an Indian politician belonging to the Trinamool Congress.He was elected to the Rajya Sabha the Upper house of Indian parliament from West Bengal in 2011.He was an IAS officer and came into public life when he joined the Singur and Nandigram protests.

References 

1931 births
Living people
Rajya Sabha members from West Bengal
Trinamool Congress politicians from West Bengal